Paola Pezzo (born 8 January 1969, in Bosco Chiesanuova) is an Italian cross-country mountain bike racer from Verona. In 1996, in Atlanta, Georgia, in the U.S., she won the Olympic gold medal in mountain biking, when the event made its debut.

Biography
Pezzo won the female World Mountain Bike Championship title in both 1993 and 1997. In 1997, she won the Grundig World Cup crown.

Achievement
She won two gold medals. One in Atlanta '96 and the other in Sydney '00. She also won the mountain-bike championships in 1993 and 1997.

See also
 Italian sportswomen multiple medalists at Olympics and World Championships

External links
 
 Her bio on the Mountain Bike Hall of Fame
 
 
 

1969 births
Living people
Italian female cyclists
Italian mountain bikers
Cross-country mountain bikers
Olympic cyclists of Italy
Olympic gold medalists for Italy
Cyclists at the 1996 Summer Olympics
Cyclists at the 2000 Summer Olympics
People from Bosco Chiesanuova
Olympic medalists in cycling
Medalists at the 1996 Summer Olympics
Medalists at the 2000 Summer Olympics
UCI Mountain Bike World Champions (women)
Cyclists from the Province of Verona